Ad Infinitum is the third EP by American rock band Of Mice & Men. It was released on December 3, 2021, through SharpTone Records. The EP was produced by the band themselves and it is the follow-up to the group's second EP, Bloom (2021). It is the third part of their so called "EP Trilogy".

Background and promotion
On September 29, 2021, four months after the band's second EP release, they unveiled a new single "Mosaic". On October 19, the band released the single "Fighting Gravity" while also announced the EP itself, the EP cover, the track list, and release date. This would be the third of three EPs released in the year. The group also surprise announced their upcoming seventh studio album, Echo, which will be released along with the EP and will compile all three EPs. On November 24, one week before the EP release, the band unveiled the third single "Echo".

Track listing

Personnel
Of Mice & Men
 Aaron Pauley – lead vocals, bass, mixing, mastering
 Alan Ashby – rhythm guitar, backing vocals
 Phil Manansala – lead guitar, backing vocals
 Valentino Arteaga – drums, percussion

Additional personnel
 Of Mice & Men – engineering, production
 Derek Hess – artwork

References

2021 EPs
Of Mice & Men (band) albums
SharpTone Records albums